Andrew B. Ingram (April 23, 1851 – September 6, 1934) was a real estate agent and political figure in Ontario, Canada. He represented Elgin West in the Legislative Assembly of Ontario from 1886 to 1890 and Elgin East in the House of Commons of Canada from 1891 to 1906 as a Liberal-Conservative member.

He was born in Strabane, Wentworth County, Canada West in 1851, the son of Thomas Ingram. In 1882, he married Elizabeth McIntyre. He was originally a railroad employee. Ingram served as president of the St. Thomas Trades and Labour Council. His election in 1891 was appealed but he won the by-election that followed in 1892.

References 

The Canadian parliamentary companion, 1887 JA Gemmill
The Canadian parliamentary companion, 1897 JA Gemmill

1851 births
1934 deaths
Businesspeople from Ontario
Canadian real estate agents
Conservative Party of Canada (1867–1942) MPs
Members of the House of Commons of Canada from Ontario
Politicians from Hamilton, Ontario
Progressive Conservative Party of Ontario MPPs